La esquina del diablo (English: Devil's Corner), is a Colombian telenovela produced by RCN and RTI Producciones for UniMás. Ana Serradilla and Miguel de Miguel star as the protagonists, while Gregorio Pernía and Christian Tappan star as the antagonists.

Cast 
Ana Serradilla as Ana García
Miguel de Miguel as Eder Martín
Gregorio Pernía as Yago
Christian Tappan as Angel Velasco
Quique Mendoza as Seisdedos
Julián Caicedo as Cachalote
Ernesto Ballén as Bateador
Juan Carlos Messier as Daniel
Antonio Jiménez as Andrade
Juán Pablo Gamboa as Alcalde Gómez
Ariel Díaz as Sánchez

References

External links 
 

2015 telenovelas
Spanish-language telenovelas
Colombian telenovelas
2015 Colombian television series debuts
2015 Colombian television series endings
RTI Producciones telenovelas
RCN Televisión telenovelas
Television shows set in Colombia